Amal Mahadik is an Indian politician and member of the Bharatiya Janata Party.

Career
Amal Mahadik is a first term member of the Maharashtra Legislative Assembly from the Kolhapur South assembly constituency, Maharashtra. He won the seat from sitting MLA and minister Satej Patil in 2014.

Positions held 
Maharashtra Legislative Assembly MLA.
Terms in office:2014–2019.

Family
Amal Mahadik father Mahadeo Mahadik is a member of the Maharashtra Legislative Council  MLC from the  Indian National Congress.but, on 2015 he lost his seat from former minister satej patil . Satej patil won mlc by 165 votes. His cousin Dhananjay Mahadik is Member of Parliament Lok Sabha from Kolhapur constituency he is from the  Nationalist Congress Party.on 2019, election dhananjay mahadik lost his seat from shiv sena mp sanjay sadashivrao mandlik with the margin of 2,70,000 votes.

References 

Marathi politicians
Bharatiya Janata Party politicians from Maharashtra
Maharashtra MLAs 2014–2019
Living people
People from Kolhapur
Year of birth missing (living people)